Keachi Baptist Church is a historic Baptist church on Louisiana Highway 172 in Keachi in Desoto Parish, Louisiana.  The building was constructed in about 1880 in a transitional architectural style, between late Greek Revival and the Gothic Revival.

It has auditorium-style seats which appear to have been salvaged from the former Keachi Female College, across the roadway.

It is significant as representing the persistence of the Greek Revival style in Desoto Parish well after the Civil War.

The church was added to the National Register of Historic Places in 1988.

See also
National Register of Historic Places listings in DeSoto Parish, Louisiana

References

Baptist churches in Louisiana
Churches on the National Register of Historic Places in Louisiana
Greek Revival church buildings in Louisiana
Gothic Revival church buildings in Louisiana
Churches completed in 1880
Churches in DeSoto Parish, Louisiana
National Register of Historic Places in DeSoto Parish, Louisiana